Emiliano Tarana (born 3 January 1979 in Casalmaggiore, Province of Cremona) is an Italian footballer who plays for Italian third-division-side FeralpiSalò.

Career
Tarana started his career at Parma, about 21 km away from hometown Casalmaggiore. He spent 4 seasons on loan to various clubs before signed permanently by Piacenza in July 2003. In January 2005, he left for his current club Mantova, at that time at Serie C1.

On 16 August 2011, he signed a two-year contract with FeralpiSalò.

References

External links
 Profile at Mantova 
 Profile at Football.it 

1979 births
Living people
People from Casalmaggiore
Italian footballers
Parma Calcio 1913 players
S.S. Arezzo players
Ternana Calcio players
A.C. Perugia Calcio players
Modena F.C. players
A.C. Ancona players
Piacenza Calcio 1919 players
Mantova 1911 players
Serie A players
Serie B players
Association football midfielders
Sportspeople from the Province of Cremona
Footballers from Lombardy